Wrightsboro is the name of several towns in the United States, including:

 Wrightsboro, Georgia
 Wrightsboro, North Carolina
 Wrightsboro, Texas